Ehsan Danish (2 February 1914 – 22 March 1982), born Ehsan-ul-Haq ), was an Urdu poet, prose writer, linguist, lexicographer and scholar from Pakistan. Ehsan Danish had penned down over 100 scholastic books on poetry, prose, linguistics, lexicography and prosody. At the beginning of his career his poetry was very romantic but later he wrote his poems more for the labourers and came to be called "Šhāʿir-e Mazdūr" (Poet of the workmen) by his audience. According to one commentator, his poetry inspired the common people's feelings and he has been compared with Josh Malihabadi. He holds the unique position as one of the best poets of all times, with fine, romantic and revolutionary, but simple style of poetry.

Biography
Danish (birth name: Ehsan-ul-Haq) was born in Maulanan मोलानान Kandhla, a small town in the Shamli district of Uttar Pradesh, India. He belonged to a poor family and he could not continue his studies due to financial reasons but still learned the Arabic and Persian languages on his own. His father's name was Danish Ali. Later he migrated to Lahore and settled there permanently. He struggled very hard to earn his living. He worked as an ordinary labourer for years in odd jobs, finally becoming a poet of excellence. His autobiography, Jahan-i-Danish, is a classic and has inspired many people. Danish has written more than 80 books and hundreds of articles about and including poetry, prose, linguistics, philology, autobiographies and the famous interpretation of "Diwan-e-Ghalib". Much of his literary work is still unpublished.

Death and legacy
He died on 22 March 1982 in Lahore and was laid to rest at Miani Sahib Graveyard. His poetry and writings about the dignity of labour earned him the title of 'Shaer-i-Mazdoor' (poet of the labourers).

Autobiography - Jahan-e-Danish
Ehsan Danish was a prolific prose writer and had contributed hundred of articles, essays and books in the domain of Urdu prose. Ehsan Danish autobiography "Jahan-e-danish" is a splendid masterpiece in Urdu literature. Jahan-e-Danish was first published in 1973 by Ehsan Danish in Lahore, Pakistan and duly received Adam Ji literary award in recognition of its literary value and linguistic stature. The language, diction, realism, sincerity and above all a unique classical flavor of language and literature elevates this autobiography at the highest position in the realm of Urdu autobiographies.

An excerpt
Maulvi Saeed talks of Ehsan Danish, the poet. He recalls:

"In 1928, when we lived in Mozang I happened to be present at a gathering in the street adjoining ours where a short-statured but a well-built darkish young man recited a naat in a voice which kept the audience spell-bound. The poet was Ehsan-bin-Danish (now Ehsan Danish, for 'bin' though in Arabic stood for 'son of', in Hindi meant 'without'). The poet had come from across the Yamuna in search of employment – and perhaps recognition, too. Lahore gave him both; employment which hardly did any credit to this city, recognition, of course, which it never held back.

Ehsan was seen in the evening at the mushairas; in the morning, at the building sites with a brush in one hand and the lime-bucket in the other; or doing a gardener's job on the Simla Hill. He has recorded the experiences of his early days in a fascinating autobiography –    Jahan-e-Danish. In the realm of poetry, he was not a mere labourer, but a master architect."

Awards
 Sitara-e-Imtiaz (Star of Excellence) Award (1978) from the President of Pakistan.

Publications
Jahan-i-Danish, his autobiography. 
 Jahan-i Diger
 Tazkir-o-Tanees
 Iblagh-i-Danish
 Tashrih-i-Ghalib
 Awaz sey Alfaz tak
 Fasl-i-Salasil
 Zanjir-i-Baharan
 Abr-i-Naisan
 Miras-i-Momin
 Urdu Mutaradifaat
 Dard-i-Zindagi
 Hadis-i-Adab
 Lughat-ul-Islah
 Nafeer-i-Fitrat
 Dasttoor-i-Urdu
 Ramooz-i-Ghalib
 Meerras-i-maumin

Ehsan Danish Poetry
Ehsan Danish was titled Poet-Laborer (Shair-e-Mazdoor) due to his revolutionary, passionate and novel poems for the laborers, the poor people and the oppressed. He had presented stark realities about the labor class in a powerful and unique style. He was initially impressed with the poet Josh Malihabadi's style of poetry.

yeh uDi uDi si rangat yeh khule khule se gesu 
teri sub,h keh rahi hai teri raat ka fasana

See also
List of Pakistani poets
List of Urdu poets
Naz Khialvi

References

External links
Govt. of India Link

1914 births
1982 deaths
Muhajir people
Poets from Lahore
Pakistani poets
Urdu-language poets from Pakistan
Recipients of Sitara-i-Imtiaz
Pakistani philologists
Writers from Lahore
20th-century poets
20th-century philologists